The 1973 Bandy World Championship was the eighth Bandy World Championship and was contested between four men's bandy playing nations. The championship was played in Moscow and Krasnogorsk (Soviet Union) on February 17–24, 1973. The Soviet Union became champions.

Participants

Premier tour
 17 February
 Sweden-Finland 5–4
 Soviet Union – Norway 11–0
 18 February
 Sweden – Norway 3–1
 Soviet Union – Finland 8–3
 20 February
 Soviet Union – Sweden 5–1
 Finland – Norway 3–2
 21 February
 Finland – Sweden 0–8
 Soviet Union – Norway 4–0
 23 February
 Norway – Sweden 1–4
 Soviet Union – Finland 3–0
 24 February
 Soviet Union – Sweden 1–0
 Norway – Finland 4–3

References

1973 in bandy
International bandy competitions hosted by the Soviet Union
1973
1973 in Soviet sport
February 1973 sports events in Europe